Jamie Moore (born 4 November 1978) is a British boxing trainer and former professional boxer who competed from 1999 to 2010. He held the British and Commonwealth super welterweight titles twice between 2003 and 2007, and the European super welterweight title in 2009

Moore vacated the British title in December 2007 to concentrate on the European title, which he won in March 2009 by stopping former world champion Michele Piccirillo in the 3rd round. He announced his retirement on 12 April 2010, upon receiving medical advice from the British Boxing Board of Control.

Boxing career
Moore boxed as an amateur before turning professional in October 1999. He won his professional debut against Jamie Rolfe scoring a knockout in the third second of the first round on a card that included Thomas Eade, Robert Hill Daniels, Paul Barnard and journeyman Peter Buckley.

Moore's first opportunity to fight for a title belt, the WBU Intercontinental light middleweight title, was in July 2001. However, Moore suffered the first defeat of his career when Scott Dixon stopped Moore in the fifth of the scheduled twelve rounds to take the title, despite Moore having Dixon down in the third round.

Trilogy with Michael Jones
In 2003, Moore fought Liverpool's Michael Jones for both the British and Commonwealth light middleweight title at the Everton Park Sports Centre in north Liverpool. Moore won this tough fight on points to win his first professional title. Moore retained the British title in subsequent fights and became the first Salford Fighter in over 100 years to win the Lonsdale Belt. However, this was not the last that Moore was to see of Liverpudlian Michael Jones, as the pair fought again in November 2004 again at the Altrincham Leisure Centre in Greater Manchester for the British title. This time around, Moore lost after being disqualified in the third round to hitting on the break. The pair again faced each other for a third and final time in July 2005 at the same venue and once again for the British light middleweight title, but this time Moore avenged the defeat he suffered the previous year by stopping Jones in the sixth round. Following this, Moore avenged his loss Thomas Eade in a huge showdown.

Professional boxing record

Matthew Macklin Affair
Moore's most high-profile fight in his professional career came in September 2006 when he fought Matthew Macklin in Manchester. Macklin, himself a former Irish middleweight titleholder and at the time being trained at Billy Graham's gym across the city from Moore's gym, helped to increase the rivalry leading up to the fight. Moore defeated Macklin in a "fight of the year" contender to reclaim the British light middleweight title.

Shooting in Marbella
Four years after retiring from boxing, Moore was shot twice, once in the hip and in the leg in Marbella on 3 August 2014. Moore, working as a pundit for Sky Sports, was in Spain to train old foe Matthew Macklin, who now owned a gym in the Costa del Sol resort. In the aftermath of the incident, Macklin tweeted: "Just to let everyone know Jamie Moore is still in hospital but he's OK. He was shot in his legs but the doctors have said there shouldn't be any serious or permanent damage done."

Trainer of the year 2018
In 2018 Moore was awarded trainer of the year after winning multiple titles as a trainer with a bunch of talented fighters including Carl Frampton, Rocky Fielding and more. Moore is going from strength to strength in his career as a boxing trainer, with the likes of Carl Frampton, Tommy Coyle, Martin Murray, Rocky Fielding and most recently Jack Catterall all linking up with him and Nigel Travis at the VIP Gym in Astley in the last few months. In 2021, Moore opened Walkden ABC, an amateur boxing gym, in his hometown.

His current stable in 2019 includes Amir Khan, Tyson Fury, Carl Frampton, Tommy Coyle, Steven Ward, Martin Murray, Rocky Fielding, Jack Catterall, Aqib Fiaz, Chantelle Cameron, Sean McGoldrick, Dave Allen and Marc Leach.

Titles in boxing

|-

|-

|-

|-

|-

|-

After Retirement
Moore is co-founder of Maverick Stars Trust charity based in Walkden. It includes a boxing gym for all ages named Walkden ABC.

References

External links

Jamie Moore official website

1978 births
Living people
Sportspeople from Salford
English male boxers
Light-middleweight boxers
European Boxing Union champions